Norman S. Hall (July 21, 189512 December 1964) was an American screenwriter from the 1930s to the 1960s.

Hall was born in New Milford, Connecticut and died in Los Angeles, California.

Selected filmography
 Outlaws of Pine Ridge (1942)
 Black Hills Express (1943)
 Days of Old Cheyenne (1943)
 Sheriff of Sundown (1944)
 Rio Grande Raiders (1946)

External links 
 

1895 births
1964 deaths
People from New Milford, Connecticut
American male screenwriters
Screenwriters from Connecticut
20th-century American male writers
20th-century American screenwriters